The 2013 Dothan Pro Tennis Classic was a professional tennis tournament played on outdoor clay courts. It was the thirteenth edition of the tournament which was part of the 2013 ITF Women's Circuit, offering a total of $50,000 in prize money. It took place in Dothan, Alabama, United States, on April 15–21, 2013.

WTA entrants

Seeds 

 1 Rankings are as of April 8, 2013

Other entrants 
The following players received wildcards into the singles main draw:
  Victoria Duval
  Allie Kiick
  Sachia Vickery
  Allie Will

The following players received entry from the qualifying draw:
  Jan Abaza
  Belinda Bencic
  Angelique van der Meet
  Laura Siegemund

The following player received entry by a Protected Ranking:
  Ajla Tomljanović

Champions

Singles 

  Ajla Tomljanović def.  Zhang Shuai 2–6, 6–4, 6–3

Doubles 

  Julia Cohen /  Tatjana Maria def.  Irina Falconi /  Maria Sanchez 6–4, 4–6, [11–9]

External links 
 2013 Dothan Pro Tennis Classic at ITFtennis.com
 

Dothan Pro Tennis Classic
Hardee's Pro Classic
Dothan Pro Tennis Classic